The 2011 FIM Dansk Metal Danish Speedway Grand Prix was the fourth race of the 2011 Speedway Grand Prix season. It took place on June 11 at the Parken Stadium in Copenhagen, Denmark.

Riders 
The Speedway Grand Prix Commission nominated Mikkel B. Jensen as Wild Card, and Michael Jepsen Jensen and Kenneth Arendt Larsen as Track Reserves. The Draw was made on June 10 by Per Stig Møller, Culture Minister of Denmark and Minister for Ecclesiastical Affairs of Denmark in the Cabinet of Lars Løkke Rasmussen I.

Wild card Jensen became the youngest rider ever ride in the SGP event. The former youngest was Pole Maciej Janowski.

Results 
The Grand Prix was won by World Champion Tomasz Gollob, who beat Jason Crump, Chris Holder and Greg Hancock. Gollob became the World Championship leader.

Heat details

Heat after heat 
 (56,94) Lindbäck, Holder, Hampel, Holta
 (56,09) Łaguta, Bjerre, Pedersen, Sayfutdinov
 (56,43) Hancock, Crump, Jensen, Kołodziej (R)
 (56,53) Jonsson, Gollob, Lindgren, Harris
 (57,22) Holder, Bjerre, Jonsson, Jensen
 (56,94) Pedersen, Hampel, Hancock, Gollob
 (56,37) Crump, Lindgren, Sayfutdinov, Lindbäck
 (57,09) Harris, Łaguta, Holta, Kołodziej
 (57,19) Crump, Holder, Pedersen (Fx), Harris (Fx)
 (56,97) Lindgren, Hampel, Bjerre, Kołodziej
 (57,22) Gollob, Łaguta, Jensen, Lindbäck
 (57,25) Holta, Sayfutdinov, Hancock, Jonsson (Fx)
 (56,21) Gollob, Sayfutdinov, Holder, Kołodziej
 (56,41) Hampel, Crump, Jonsson, Łaguta
 (57,07) Harris, Hancock, Lindbäck, Bjerre
 (56,81) Pedersen, Holta, Lindgren, Jensen
 (57,32) Hancock, Holder, Lindgren, Łaguta
 (57,57) Hampel, Sayfutdinov, Harris, Jensen
 (57,65) Kołodziej, Jonsson, Lindbäck, Pedersen (Fx)
 (57,37) Gollob, Crump, Bjerre, Holta
 Semi-Finals:
 (56,87) Hancock, Crump, Lindgren, Harris
 (56,28) Gollob, Holder, Hampel, Pedersen
 the Final:
 (56,50) Gollob (6 points), Crump (4), Holder (2), Hancock (0)

The intermediate classification

See also 
 motorcycle speedway

References 

Speedway Grand Prix of Denmark
Denmark
2011